The following lists events that happened during 1870 in Australia.

Incumbents

Governors
Governors of the Australian colonies:
 Governor of New South Wales – Somerset Lowry-Corry, 4th Earl Belmore
 Governor of Queensland – Colonel Sir Samuel Blackall
 Governor of South Australia – Sir James Fergusson, 6th Baronet
 Governor of Tasmania – Charles Du Cane
 Governor of Victoria – John Manners-Sutton, 3rd Viscount Canterbury
Governor of Western Australia – The Hon. Sir Frederick Weld GCMG.

Premiers
Premiers of the Australian colonies:
 Premier of New South Wales – John Robertson, until 13 January then Charles Cowper, until 16 December then James Martin
 Premier of Queensland – Charles Lilley, until 3 May then Arthur Hunter Palmer
 Premier of South Australia – Henry Strangways, until 30 May then John Hart
 Premier of Tasmania – James Milne Wilson
 Premier of Victoria – John Alexander MacPherson, until 9 April then James McCulloch

Events
 3 January – A state flag of Western Australia is adopted.
 1 February – A state flag of Victoria is adopted, although with no crown like the current flag.
 22 March – A state flag of Queensland is adopted, with a portrait of Queen Victoria.
 20 April – A second state flag of New South Wales is adopted, similar to the current flag of Victoria: a crown above the Southern Cross.
 22 July – A state flag of South Australia is adopted.
 11 August – Melbourne Town Hall is opened.

Exploration and settlement
 Gulgong, New South Wales, is founded.
 27 August – John Forrest successfully arrives in Adelaide from Perth, leading an expedition along the south coast via the Great Australian Bight.

Science and technology
 September – Work begins on the Australian Overland Telegraph Line linking Port Augusta to Darwin.

Sport
 12 May – Port Adelaide Football Club is founded in South Australia

Births
 3 January – Ethel Richardson, author (d. 1946)
 14 January – Sir George Pearce, Western Australian politician (d. 1952)
 17 May – Sir Newton Moore, 8th Premier of Western Australia (d. 1936)
 1 November – Christopher Brennan, poet, scholar and literary critic (d. 1932)
 21 November – Joe Darling, cricketer (d. 1946)
 26 December – Norman Ewing, 23rd Tasmanian Opposition Leader (d. 1928)

Deaths
 23 May – Foster Fyans, military officer, administrator and politician (born in Ireland) (b. 1790)
 25 May – Captain Thunderbolt, bushranger (b. 1835)
 24 June – Adam Lindsay Gordon, South Australian politician and (born in the United Kingdom) poet (b. 1833)

References

 
Australia
Years of the 19th century in Australia